Jungle Jingles is a 1929 animated film produced by Winkler Productions and part of the Oswald the Lucky Rabbit series.

Plot
Oswald is riding on an ostrich, venturing the African jungles. Suddenly, his ostrich decides to make a stop, causing him to be thrown forward. While the disturbed Oswald lets out his dissatisfaction, the large bird lays an egg. The egg hatches, but the offspring chooses to go a separate path rather than to stay with its mother.

Just nearby, an elephant is playing golf using his trunk as a club, and coconuts as balls. The elephant executes a shot but the coconut just veers away from the hole. After missing the next several shots without even scoring once, the frustrated golfer starts striking the coconuts at random directions. One of them strikes Oswald's ostrich, prompting that bird to quickly flee the scene. Oswald too is hit and is dazed for a few seconds.

Annoyed, Oswald confronts and tells the elephant to stop, threatening to attack. Not liking to be commanded by someone, the elephant gives a raspberry as Oswald turns around. Oswald then retaliates as he roughs up and wrestles the elephant to the ground. Momentarily, the elephant's huge father comes by. Seemingly intimidated by the larger pachyderm, Oswald helps the downed son get back on his feet. The elephant walks away, leaving Oswald to face the wrath of his father. But Oswald isn't actually hopeless as he reveals and opens a cage containing a mouse, much to the big elephant's panic.

As the big elephant runs in terror with the mouse chasing, Oswald is laughing out loud. While he does, a squirrel silently walks by and kicks him from behind. Oswald chases the squirrel into a cave, only to be forced back out by something stronger. It turns out that the more powerful creature is a lion as it exits the cave. Oswald quickly makes his getaway.

While running from the lion, Oswald drops tacks on the ground but they barely slow down the big cat. When the two run into a straw house, the tables are turned when Oswald gets his hands on a shotgun which he fires at the lion. Upon running out of bullets, Oswald retreats and takes refuge inside a hollow log. To extract the rabbit from inside, the lion extends its scissor-jacked teeth into the log. Although the jaws close on their target, the lion struggles to pull out Oswald who strongly refuses to be taken. Unfortunately for the lion, the scissor-extenders that connect to the teeth detach from its mouth. Returning the ordeal, Oswald uses the extendable teeth to bite back at the lion, and chases the big cat deep into the jungle.

See also
Oswald the Lucky Rabbit filmography

References

External links
Of Rocks and Socks: The Winkler Oswalds (1928-29)
Jungle Jingles at the Big Cartoon Database

1929 films
1929 animated films
1920s American animated films
1920s animated short films
Films set in Africa
Films set in jungles
Oswald the Lucky Rabbit cartoons
Universal Pictures animated short films
American black-and-white films
Animated films about animals
Screen Gems short films